Oloipiri is an administrative ward in the Ngorongoro District of the Arusha Region of Tanzania. According to the 2012 census, the ward has a total population of 4,114.

References

Wards of Ngorongoro District
Wards of Arusha Region
Ngorongoro District